The West Indies national cricket team visited India in 1994 for a 5-match ODI series and followed by a 3-match test series. India won the ODI series 4-1 and the test series was drawn 1-1.

The bilateral ODI series was played around the Wills world series 1994-95, a triangular ODI tournament featuring India, West Indies and New Zealand, and also won by India. The triangular ODI tournament was played in colour clothing while the bilateral series was played in whites.

Squads

ODI Series

1st ODI 
Shivnarine Chanderpaul, Cameron Cuffy and Stuart Williams made their ODI debuts for the West Indies.

Kapil Dev's last ODI for India.

2nd ODI 
Barrington Browne made his ODI debut for the West Indies.

3rd ODI

4th ODI

5th ODI 
Brian Lara was the captain of the West Indies instead of Courtney Walsh, who was rested.

Test Series

1st Test

2nd Test

3rd Test

References

External links 

International cricket competitions from 1994–95 to 1997
1994 in Indian cricket
1994 in West Indian cricket
West Indian cricket tours of India